Félix Dufour-Laperrière (born 1981) is a Canadian animator, film director and screenwriter from Chicoutimi, Quebec. He is most noted for his 2021 film Archipelago (Archipel), which was the winner of the Prix Luc-Perreault from the Association québécoise des critiques de cinéma at the 2022 Rendez-vous Québec Cinéma.

He also received two Prix Iris nominations for the film at the 24th Quebec Cinema Awards in 2022, for Best Documentary Film and Best Editing in a Documentary.

Dufour made a number of short films before releasing his debut feature documentary film, Transatlantic (Transatlantique), in 2014. He was a four-time Jutra Award nominee for Best Animated Short Film, receiving nods at the 6th Jutra Awards in 2004 for Black Ink on Sky Blue (Encre noire sur fond d'azur), the 11th Jutra Awards in 2009 for Rosa Rosa, the 12th Jutra Awards in 2010 for M, and the 16th Jutra Awards in 2014 for The Day Is Listening (Le jour nous écoute).

His narrative feature debut, Ville Neuve, was a nominee for the DGC Discovery Award in 2018.

Filmography

References

External links

1981 births
Living people
21st-century Canadian screenwriters
21st-century Canadian male writers
Canadian male screenwriters
Canadian screenwriters in French
Canadian animated film directors
Canadian documentary film directors
Film directors from Quebec
Writers from Saguenay, Quebec
Canadian film editors
Film producers from Quebec